L. B. T. Premaratne was the 25th Solicitor General of Ceylon. He was appointed on 1968, succeeding Walter Jayawardena, and held the office until 1970. He was succeeded by Hector Deheragoda.

References

P